Teen Titans Go! is an American animated television series based on the DC Comics fictional superhero team, the Teen Titans. The series was announced following the popularity of DC Nation's New Teen Titans shorts, both of which are based on the 2003 Teen Titans TV series. Teen Titans Go! is a more comedic take on the DC Comics franchise, dealing with situations that happen every day. Sporting a different animation style, Teen Titans Go! serves as a comedic standalone spin-off with no continuity to the previous series, and only certain elements are retained. Many DC characters make cameo appearances and are referenced in the background. The original principal voice cast returns to reprise their respective roles.

Series overview

Episodes

Season 1 (2013–14)

Season 2 (2014–15)

Season 3 (2015–16)

Season 4 (2016–18)

Season 5 (2018–20)

Season 6 (2019–21)

Season 7 (2021–22)

Season 8 (2022–23)

Films

Specials

Top of the Titans (2018)
This is a series of clip show specials which are framed as "top 10"-style countdowns hosted by Birdarang in four episodes and Robin in "Best Rivals".

Other

Shorts

Lego Dimensions exclusive episode
This special episode was released as part of the Teen Titans Go! packs for Lego Dimensions.

DC FanDome short

Home media

Notes

References

External links
 

episodes
2010s television-related lists
2020s television-related lists
Lists of Cartoon Network television series episodes
Lists of American children's animated television series episodes
Lists of American comedy television series episodes
Lists of DC Nation television series episodes